Section 5 may refer to:

Section 5 of the Indian Limitation Act
Section 5 of the Public Order Act 1986, in England and Wales
Section 5 of the Canadian Charter of Rights and Freedoms
Section 5 of the Constitution of Australia
Section 5 of the Voting Rights Act, in the United States
Section 5, a football hooligan firm

See also

Military Intelligence, Section 5 or MI5, British domestic intelligence agency